A rotunda is any building with a circular ground plan, and sometimes covered by a dome. It may also refer to a round room within a building (a famous example being the one below the dome of the United States Capitol in Washington, D.C.). The Pantheon in Rome is a famous rotunda. A band rotunda is a circular bandstand, usually with a dome.

Rotunda in Central Europe
A great number of parochial churches were built in this form in the 9th to 11th centuries CE in Central Europe. These round churches can be found in great number in Hungary, Poland, Slovakia, Croatia (particularly Dalmatia) Austria, Bavaria, Germany, and the Czech Republic. It was thought of as a structure descending from the Roman Pantheon. However, it can be found mainly not on former Roman territories, but in Central Europe. Generally its size was 6–9 meters inner diameter and the apse was directed toward the east. Sometimes three or four apses were attached to the central circle and this type has relatives even in the Caucasus.

Rotunda in the Carpathian Basin

Several types of rotundas are found in the Carpathian Basin, within the former boundaries of Kingdom of Hungary. Building of rotundas in Carpathian basin started already in 9th century in Great Moravia. According to the research and radiocarbon dating of plaster, Rotunda of st. George in Nitrianska Blatnica was built sometimes around the year 830, what makes it one of the oldest still standing buildings in the area of Central Europe. Similar rotunda was standing in hillfort Kostolec in Ducové (only foundations remained). The role and form of rotundas developed from gradual enlargements of ancient small village churches. Many of them still stand today, e.g. in Nagytótlak, Kallósd and Kissikátor in Hungary or in Bíňa and Šivetice in Slovakia. Rotunda in Šivetice is the biggest one in Central Europe, with diameter of 11 m. In many places the ancient foundations have been excavated and conserved. The village church of Sárospatak is complete with a simple circular nave and an eastern apse. The church of Alagimajor at Dunakeszi was enlarged toward the apse in the 14th century. More significant enlargement of the central rotunda is seen at Isaszeg where the extension extended toward the East and West; the rotunda foundations can also be seen in the central portion of the nave of the Gothic church. In many cases the rotunda was used as the apse of the village's new and larger church (Bagod-Szentpál, Hidegség, Vágkeresztur, Ipolykiskeszi, Herencsény, Szalonna). Such semi-circle apses are preserved all over the Carpathian Basin. Rotundas of six apses, a most interesting form, are found at Karcsa, Kiszombor in Hungary, at Horjany in Ukraine and several places in Armenia (Aragatz, Bagaran, Bagnayr, Botshor, Kiagmis Alti).

Rotunda in the Caucasus

There is an interesting connection between Central European and Caucasian rotundas of the 9th to 11th centuries AD. Several Armenian built rotunda churches have sixfold arched central apsis, i.e. at Aragatz, Bagaran, Bagnayr, Botshor, Kiagmis Alti in Armenia. At the same time eightfold arched central buildings (rotunda) are also frequently occurring in Armenia: Ani, Irind, Varzhahan. It was a suggestion (Csemegi J.) that there was not only western European but Eastern Caucasian relation for architects of Hungary in this age of King Stephen I of Hungary.

Good example of Georgian rotunda church is Bana cathedral which is now located on territory of Turkey.

Rotunda in Asia

 Temple of Heaven construction completed on 1420 during Yongle Emperor who also constructed Forbidden City of China.
 Fujian Tulou is a traditional rural dwellings of the Hakka in Fujian region of China. They are built between the 12th and the 20th centuries.

Notable rotundas

Religious buildings
Baptistery at the Piazza dei Miracoli, Pisa, Italy.
Pantheon, Rome, Italy, originally built as a temple to the seven deities of the seven planets in the state religion of Ancient Rome; now used as a basilica informally named Santa Maria della Rotonda
 Santo Stefano Rotondo, Rome.
 The Church of the Rotonda in Thessaloniki, built as the "Tomb of Galerius" in 306 AD.
 St George Rotunda in Sofia, Bulgaria, a 4th-century Early Christian church.
 St. George Cathedral Church at Zvartnots, Armenia.
 St. Martin's Rotunda in Vyšehrad Castle, Prague, Czech Republic.
 Rotunda of St Marija Assunta in Mosta, Malta.
 Temple Church in London.
 The Ducal Rotunda of the Virgin Mary and St Catherine in Znojmo, Czech Republic.
 Chausathi Yogini temples in India at Hirapur, Jabalpur and Morena
 Bahá'í House of Worship in Willmette, Illinois, USA.
 The Rotunda in Aldershot in the UK, built in 1876 and demolished in the 1980s

Buildings for entertainment
Ranelagh Gardens in London, built in the 1740s and demolished in 1805. It was painted by Canaletto.
Pantheon, London, opened 1772, demolished in 1937.
The leisure centre at Fort Regent, in St Helier, Jersey, a regular venue for shows, concerts and events
 The internal Rotunda in the Michael Maddox Petrovsky Theatre, Moscow (burnt down in 1805).
Gate Theatre in Dublin, Ireland (formerly part of the Rotunda Hospital, built in 1757).
Roundhouse in London, originally built in 1847 as a turntable engine shed, it was used as a gin store till being converted into a theatre in the 1960s.
Royal Albert Hall in London, England.
IMAX Theatre in London, England.
The Jackie Robinson Rotunda at Citi Field.
Romanian Athenaeum in Bucharest. It is a concert hall and a landmark of the Romanian capital city. Opened in 1888, the ornate, domed, circular building is the city's main concert hall and home of the "George Enescu" Philharmonic and of the George Enescu annual international music festival.
 Ohio Stadium in Columbus, Ohio, built in 1922

Residential buildings
Villa Capra "La Rotonda" by the Italian Renaissance architect Andrea Palladio in Vicenza, Italy.
Ickworth House in Suffolk, England.
Mereworth Castle in Kent, England.
The Rotunda in Birmingham, England, built as an office building in 1964.
The Rotunda Building, Norfolk, Virginia, rebuilt in 2007.

Buildings for learning
 The Radcliffe Camera, Oxford, completed in 1748.
 The Rotunda at the University of Virginia built in 1826.
 British Museum Reading Room, London, built in 1857.
 The Rotunda Museum, Scarborough, North Yorkshire.
 The Central Library, Manchester.
 Dallas Hall at Southern Methodist University, Dallas, Texas, built in 1911.
 Grawemeyer Hall at the University of Louisville, built in 1926.
 Stockholm Public Library, Stockholm, built in 1928.
 Umeå University, Umeå, built in 1972.
 Cincinnati Museum Center at Union Terminal built in 1933.
 Science Museum of Virginia built in 1919
 Vanderbilt University's Wyatt Center.
 Drew University's Dorothy Young Center for the Arts built in 2002, and opened in 2003.
 The Campus Activity Centre at Thompson Rivers University, Kamloops, British Columbia.
 Ruffner Hall at Longwood University built in 1839, reconstructed in 2004

Government buildings
San Francisco City Hall
The Beehive, the executive wing of the New Zealand Parliament Buildings
 California State Capitol Rotunda in Sacramento, California.
 Library of Parliament, a library for Canadian Parliamentarians. The only component of the Centre Block of Parliament to survive the 1916 fire
 The Rotundas, Marsham Street, a subterranean structure in Marsham Street in London
 The Samsad Bhavan, or the federal Parliament of India, in New Delhi
 San Jose City Hall rotunda in San Jose, California, an all-glass, postmodern structure
 United States Capitol rotunda
 West Virginia State Capitol
 Wisconsin State Capitol Rotunda
 Vermont State Capitol

Commercial buildings
 Capitol Records Building in Hollywood, Los Angeles, California

See also
 Rotunda (disambiguation)
 Round church
 Tholos

References

Further reading 
 Vera, Gervers-Molnár (1972): A középkori Magyarország rotundái. (Rotunda in the Medieval Hungary). Akadémiai, Budapest
 József, Csemegi (1949): A tarnaszentmáriai templom hajójának stíluskritikai vizsgálata. (Studies on the Nave of the Church at Tarnaszentmária.) in: Antiquitas Hungarica III (1949), 92-107.
 Osterlar Church in Danmark

External links

Rooms
Domes